Märchenblau is the third studio album released by Joachim Witt in 1983.  Two tracks, "Night and Day" and "I Know – We Know (She Knows Kino)" are entirely in English.

Track listing
All tracks composed by Joachim Witt; except where noted.
 "Märchenblau"  "Fairy-tale Blue" 
 "Einmal werd´ich ganz berühmt"  "One day I'll be Famous" 
 "Rhythmus im Blut"  "Rhythm in Blood" 
 "Halt mich"  "Hold me" 
 "Wie ein wilder Stier"  "Like a savage Bull" 
 "Hörner in der Nacht"  "Horns in the Night" 
 "Night and Day" (Cole Porter)
 "I Know – We Know" (She Knows Kino)
 "Wieder bin ich nicht geflogen"  "Again I did not Fly"

Personnel
Joachim Witt - vocals, guitar, bass
Ralf Engelbrecht - guitar
Rosko Gee - bass
Helmut Zerlett - keyboards
Jaki Liebezeit - drums
Matthias Keul - contrabass
Gerd Dudek - saxophone
Joachim Fink - trombone

1983 albums
Joachim Witt albums